The Geometry Center was a mathematics research and education center at the University of Minnesota. It was established by the National Science Foundation in the late 1980s and closed in 1998. The focus of the center's work was the use of computer graphics and visualization for research and education in pure mathematics and geometry.

The center's founding director was Al Marden.  Richard McGehee directed the center during its final years. The center's governing board was chaired by David P. Dobkin.

Geomview
Much of the work done at the center was for the development of Geomview, a three-dimensional interactive geometry program. This focused on mathematical visualization with options to allow hyperbolic space to be visualised. It was originally written for Silicon Graphics workstations, and has been ported to run on Linux systems; it is available for installation in most Linux distributions through the package management system.

Geomview is built on the Object Oriented Graphics Library (OOGL). The displayed scene and the attributes of the objects in it may be manipulated by the graphical command language (GCL) of Geomview. Geomview may be set as a default 3-D viewer for Mathematica.

Videos
Geomview was used in the construction of several mathematical movies including:
Not Knot, exploring hyperbolic space rendering of knot complements. 
Outside In, a movie about sphere eversion. 
The shape of space, exploring possible three dimensional spaces.

Other software
Other programs developed at the Center included:
WebEQ, a web browser plugin allowing mathematical equations to be viewed and edited. 
Kali, to explore plane symmetry groups. 
The Orrery, a Solar System visualizer. 
SaVi, a satellite visualisation tool for examining the orbits and coverage of satellite constellations. 
Crafter, for structural design of spacecraft. 
Surface Evolver, to explore minimal surfaces.  
SnapPea, a hyperbolic 3-manifold analyzer. 
qhull, to explore convex hulls. 
KaleidoTile, to explore tessellations of the sphere, Euclidean plane, and hyperbolic plane.

Website
Richard McGehee, the center's director, has stated that the website was one of the first one hundred websites ever published.
Geometry and the Imagination handouts for a two-week course by John Horton Conway, William Thurston and others. 
Science U, a collection of interactive exhibits. 
The Geometry Forum, an electronic community focused on geometry and math education. 
Preprints, 99 preprints from the center. 
The Topological Zoo, a collection of curves and surfaces. 

Geomview is supported through the dedicated Geomview website.

Research
During its time of operation, a large number of mathematical workshops were held at the center. Many well-known mathematicians visited the center, including Eugenio Calabi, John Horton Conway, Donald E. Knuth, David Mumford, William Thurston, and Jeff Weeks. There were over thirty postdocs, apprentices and graduate students.

References

Mathematics education in the United States
National Science Foundation mathematical sciences institutes
Research institutes in Minnesota
University of Minnesota
Visualization (research)
Geometry education